The Owen Hart Foundation Tournament, is a series of professional wrestling tournaments produced annually by the American promotion All Elite Wrestling (AEW) in partnership with The Owen Hart Foundation. It consists of two single-elimination tournaments, one  each for men and women, and the respective winners receive a trophy called "The Owen". Established in September 2021, the inaugural tournaments concluded at the Double or Nothing pay-per-view in May 2022 where Adam Cole and Dr. Britt Baker, D.M.D. won the men's and women's tournament respectively. It is named in honor of Owen Hart, who wrestled primarily in Stampede Wrestling, the World Wrestling Federation (WWF, now known as WWE), and New Japan Pro Wrestling (NJPW) from 1986 until his death in 1999.

Background 
In September 2021, AEW announced the establishment of the Owen Hart Cup, an annual tournament to honor the legacy of Owen Hart, a prominent wrestler during the 1980s and 1990s who tragically died at the WWF Over the Edge pay-per-view in 1999. The tournament was established in collaboration with The Owen Hart Foundation. On December 17, AEW revealed that there would be both a men's and women's version of the tournament, and the respective winners would receive a trophy called "The Owen Cup"  and reports have speculated that Championship belts modeled after the old Stampede Wrestling North American Championship will be awarded to the winners. Based on the Hart Family pink and black, the Women's winner will get a pink belt and the Men's winner will be awarded a black belt. It was also confirmed that the tournaments would begin in May, culminating with the finals at Double or Nothing. In deciding why there would be both a men's and women's tournament, Tony Khan likened it to Wimbledon, which also has both men's and women's tournaments.

Tournament

2022

Women's

Men's

Notes

References

2022 in professional wrestling
All Elite Wrestling shows
Professional wrestling tournaments
Women's professional wrestling tournaments
Hart wrestling family